Abuse of Power  is a novel written by radio talk show host  Michael Savage.

Plot  
Jack Hatfield is a hardened former war correspondent who rose to national prominence for his insightful, provocative commentary. But after being smeared as a bigot and extremist by a radical leftist media-watchdog group, he ultimately loses his job and finds himself working in obscurity as a freelance news producer in San Francisco.

One afternoon Hatfield is on a ride-along with the SFPD bomb squad when a seemingly routine carjacking turns deadly, after police find several pounds of military-grade explosives in the jacked car. And when the FBI urges Hatfield to stay out of it, he knows he’s onto something big.

This event will open up a shadowy trail that leads Hatfield from San Francisco to Tel Aviv, London, Paris, and back again, as he works with a stunning Yemeni intelligence agent and a veteran Green Beret to expose a terrorist group known as the Hand of Allah---and a plot within the highest corridors of power that will dwarf 9/11.

See also
 Abuse of power
 Power (social and political)

References 

2011 American novels
Novels set in San Francisco
Books by Michael Savage
St. Martin's Press books